Torre Grossa is the tallest tower in San Gimignano, with . It is one of the best known of Tuscany's medieval towers. It was built in 1310.

References

Bibliography
 

Towers in San Gimignano